F-class destroyer may refer to:

 Tribal-class destroyer (1905), twelve ships for the Royal Navy that served in World War I
 F-class destroyer (1934), nine ships for the Royal Navy that served in World War II

See also
 F class (disambiguation)